Ernest Herman "Pete" Henning (December 28, 1887 – November 4, 1939) was a Major League Baseball pitcher who played for the Kansas City Packers in  and .

External links

1887 births
1939 deaths
Kansas City Packers players
Major League Baseball pitchers
Baseball players from Indiana
Covington Blue Sox players
Kansas City Blues (baseball) players
Charleston Pals players
People from Crown Point, Indiana